Daniel Hale Williams (January 18, 1856 – August 4, 1931) was an African-American surgeon who founded Provident Hospital in 1891. It was the first non-segregated hospital in the United States. Provident also had an associated nursing school for African Americans.

He has been credited with the first successful heart surgery, however others had performed the procedure before him. 

In 1913, Williams was elected as the only African-American charter member of the American College of Surgeons.

Biography

Early life and education 

Williams was born in 1856 and raised in the city of Hollidaysburg, Pennsylvania. His father, Daniel Hale Williams Jr., was the son of a Scots-Irish woman and a black barber. His mother, Sarah Price, was African-American.

The fifth child born, Williams lived with his parents, a brother and five sisters. His family eventually moved to Annapolis, Maryland. Shortly after when Williams was nine, his father died of tuberculosis. Williams' mother realized she could not manage the entire family and sent some of the children to live with relatives. Williams was apprenticed to a shoemaker in Baltimore, Maryland but ran away to join his mother, who had moved to Rockford, Illinois. He later moved to Edgerton, Wisconsin, where he joined his sister and opened his own barber shop. After moving to nearby Janesville, Wisconsin, Williams became fascinated by the work of a local physician and decided to follow his path.

He began working as an apprentice to Dr. Henry W. Palmer, studying with him for two years. In 1880, Williams entered Chicago Medical College, now known as Northwestern University Medical School. His education was funded by Mary Jane Richardson Jones, a prominent activist and leader of Chicago's black community. After graduation from Northwestern in 1883, he opened his own medical office in Chicago, Illinois.

Career 
When Williams graduated from what is today Northwestern University Medical School, he opened a private practice where his patients were white and black. Black doctors, however, were not allowed to work in America's private hospitals.

Provident Hospital 
As a result, in 1891, Williams founded the Provident Hospital, which also provided a training residency for doctors and training school for nurses in Chicago. This was established mostly for the benefit of African-American residents, to increase their accessibility to health care, but its staff and patients were integrated from the start.

Heart surgery 
In 1893, Williams became the first African American on record to have successfully performed pericardium surgery to repair a wound. On September 6, 1891, Henry Dalton was the first American to successfully perform pericardium surgery to repair a wound. Earlier successful surgeries to drain the pericardium, by performing a pericardiostomy were done by Francisco Romero in 1801 and Dominique Jean Larrey in 1810.

On July 10, 1893, Williams repaired the torn pericardium of a knife wound patient, James Cornish. Cornish, who was stabbed directly through the left fifth costal cartilage, had been admitted the previous night. Williams decided to operate the next morning in response to continued bleeding, cough and "pronounced" symptoms of shock.  He performed this surgery, without the benefit of penicillin or blood transfusion, at Provident Hospital, Chicago. It was not reported until 1897. He undertook a second procedure to drain fluid.  About fifty days after the initial procedure, Cornish left the hospital.

Public and teaching posts 
In 1893, during the administration of President Grover Cleveland, Williams was appointed surgeon-in-chief of Freedman's Hospital in Washington, D.C., a post he held until 1898. That year he married Alice Johnson, who was born in the city and graduated from Howard University, and moved back to Chicago. In addition to organizing Provident Hospital, Williams also established a training school for African-American nurses at the facility. In 1897, he was appointed to the Illinois Department of Public Health, where he worked to raise medical and hospital standards.

Williams was a Professor of Clinical Surgery at Meharry Medical College in Nashville, Tennessee, and was an attending surgeon at Cook County Hospital in Chicago. He worked to create more hospitals that admitted African Americans. In 1895 he co-founded the National Medical Association for African-American doctors, and in 1913 he became a charter member and the only African-American doctor in the American College of Surgeons.

Death
His wife, Alice Johnson, died in 1924. Williams died in relative obscurity, of a stroke in Idlewild, Michigan on August 4, 1931. He was funeralized at St Anselm Catholic Church in Chicago, and there is debate about how well attended the service was.

Personal life 

Williams was married in 1898 to Alice Johnson, natural daughter of the Jewish-American sculptor Moses Jacob Ezekiel and a biracial maid. His retirement home was in Idlewild, Michigan, a black community.

Williams was baptized a Catholic by Fr Joseph Eckert, SVD on his deathbed. He left $2,500 (worth $44,686 in 2021) in his will to St. Elizabeth's Church in Chicago. Williams was buried at Graceland Cemetery in Chicago's Uptown neighborhood.

Legacy
In the 1890s several attempts were made to improve cardiac surgery.  On September 6, 1891 the first successful pericardial sac repair operation in the United States of America was performed by Henry C. Dalton of Saint Louis, Missouri.  The first successful surgery on the heart itself was performed by Norwegian surgeon Axel Cappelen on September 4, 1895 at Rikshospitalet in Kristiania, now Oslo.  The first successful surgery of the heart, performed without any complications, was by Dr. Ludwig Rehn of Frankfurt, Germany, who repaired a stab wound to the right ventricle on September 7, 1896. Despite these improvements, heart-related surgery was not widely accepted in the field of medical science until during World War II. Surgeons were forced to improve their methods of surgery in order to repair severe war wounds. Although they did not receive early recognition for their pioneering work, Dalton and Williams were later recognised for their roles in cardiac surgery.

Honors
Williams received honorary degrees from Howard and Wilberforce Universities, was named a charter member of the American College of Surgeons, and was a member of the Chicago Surgical Society.
 A Pennsylvania State Historical Marker was placed at U.S. Route 22 eastbound (Blair St., 300 block), Hollidaysburg, Pennsylvania, to commemorate his accomplishments and mark his boyhood home.
 His home in Chicago is now known as the Daniel Hale Williams House and was added to the National Register of Historic Places in 1975.
 His retirement home in Idlewild was given a historical marker by the state of Michigan in 2008.
 Several schools are named in his honor, including the Daniel Hale Williams Preparatory School of Medicine in Chicago; Daniel Hale Williams Elementary in Gary, Indiana; P.S. 307 Daniel Hale Williams in Brooklyn; and M.S. 180 Dr. Daniel Hale Williams in the Bronx.
 Williams Park in Chicago is also named in his honor.

Representation in other media
 The Stevie Wonder song "Black Man" honors the achievements of Williams, among others.
 Tim Reid Plays Dr. Williams in the TV series Sister, Sister season 5 episode 18 "I Have a Dream" (February 25, 1998).
 In 2002, scholar Molefi Kete Asante listed Daniel Hale Williams on his list of 100 Greatest African Americans.
 His life (along with Dr. Ulysses Grant Dailey) is retold in the radio drama "The Heart of George Cotton", presented by Destination Freedom

See also

 The Knick
 Vivien Thomas

References

Bibliography
 Bigelow, Barbara Carlisle, Contemporary Black biography: profiles from the international Black community, Gale Research Inc., 1992,

Further reading
 
 
 Chenrow, Fred; Chenrow, Carol (1973). Reading Exercises in Black History, Volume 1. Elizabethtown, PA: The Continental Press, Inc. p. 60.

External links
 
 The Provident Foundation
 The Provident Foundation History: Dr. Daniel Hale Williams
 Obituary in the Journal of the National Medical Association (PDF file).
 Amazing Black scientists

1858 births
1931 deaths
African-American physicians
American cardiac surgeons
American hospital administrators
American people of Scotch-Irish descent
People from Janesville, Wisconsin
People from Hollidaysburg, Pennsylvania
Burials at Graceland Cemetery (Chicago)
Feinberg School of Medicine alumni
Physicians from Pennsylvania
People from Lake County, Michigan
African-American Catholics
20th-century African-American people
African-American history in Chicago